Thomas Sadler may refer to:

 Thomas Vincent Faustus Sadler (1604–1681), Roman Catholic missionary in England and spiritual author
 Thomas Sadler (Unitarian) (1822–1891), English minister
 Thomas William Sadler (1831–1896), U.S. Representative from Alabama
 Thomas Sadler (cricketer) (1892–1973), English cricketer